Fee was a Christian rock and contemporary worship band from Alpharetta, Georgia, United States named for the group's founder and front-man Steve Fee. Fee is most known for their hit single, "All Because of Jesus", which peaked at No. 2 on [[Billboard (magazine)|Billboard'''s]] Hot Christian AC Chart, and at No. 4 on the Hot Christian Songs chart.

History
In January 2007 Fee released their second independent record, Burn For You.

We Shine
On September 25, 2007, Fee released their major-label debut under the name Fee titled We Shine with INO Records.

Hope Rising
In December 2008, Fee went back to the studio to begin production on their third studio album. The new album, titled Hope Rising'', was released on October 6, 2009.

Breakup
In April 2010, they stopped playing shows, canceled their upcoming tour, and halted their regular updates of their website. No official announcement explaining this was made, though Steve Fee has since admitted to an affair that came to light around that time. The group has since disbanded and their website has been taken down. Since then, both the band and Steve Fee have been dropped from their label, INO Records.

Members
 Steve Fee – vocals, rhythm guitar (acoustic and electric), keyboards
 Matt Adkins – lead guitar, vocals
 Heath Balltzglier – bass, vocals
 Brandon Coker – drums

Former members
 Josh Fisher – drums (recorded and toured before the band changed the name to Fee)

Discography

Albums

Singles

References

External links
 Fee on Myspace
 

Christian rock groups from Georgia (U.S. state)
Musical groups established in 2005